Massegros Causses Gorges is a commune in the department of Lozère, southern France. The municipality was established on 1 January 2017 by merger of the former communes of Le Massegros (the seat), Le Recoux, Saint-Georges-de-Lévéjac, Saint-Rome-de-Dolan and Les Vignes.

See also 
Communes of the Lozère department

References 

Communes of Lozère